HMS E48 was a British E class submarine launched by Fairfield Shipbuilding and Engineering Company, Govan in 1916 and was completed by William Beardmore and Company, Dalmuir. She was launched on 2 August 1916 and was commissioned in February 1917.

HMS E48 was used as a target in 1921.  She was sold to John Cashmore Ltd and scrapped at Newport in July 1928.

Design
She was powered by two  Vickers eight-cylinder two-stroke diesel engines and two  electric motors.

Untypically, E48 was armed with a 4-inch QF gun mounted forward of the conning tower. She had five 18 inch (450 mm) torpedo tubes, two in the bow, one either side amidships, and one in the stern; a total of 10 torpedoes were carried.

E-Class submarines had wireless systems with  power ratings; in some submarines, these were later upgraded to  systems by removing a midship torpedo tube. Their maximum design depth was  although in service some reached depths of below . Some submarines contained Fessenden oscillator systems.

References

Bibliography
 
 

 

British E-class submarines of the Royal Navy
Ships built in Govan
1916 ships
World War I submarines of the United Kingdom
Royal Navy ship names